Pogorelov is a Russian surname. The feminine gender is Pogorelova.

Pogorelov may refer to:
 Aleksandr Pogorelov (born 1980), Russian decathlete
 Aleksei Pogorelov (1919 – 2002), Soviet mathematician
 Aleksey Pogorelov (born 1983), Kyrgyz hurdler
 Serguei Pogorelov (born 1974), Russian team handball player

Russian-language surnames